The CHIPS and Science Act is a U.S. federal statute enacted by the 117th United States Congress and signed into law by President Joe Biden on August 9, 2022. The act provides roughly $280 billion in new funding to boost domestic research and manufacturing of semiconductors in the United States. 
The act includes $39 billion in subsidies for chip manufacturing on US soil along with 25% investment tax credits for costs of manufacturing equipment, and $13 billion for semiconductor research and workforce training, with the primary aim of countering China.

The act does not have an official short title as a whole but is divided into three divisions with their own short titles: Division A is the CHIPS Act of 2022 (where CHIPS stands for "Creating Helpful Incentives to Produce Semiconductors"); Division B is the Research and Development, Competition, and Innovation Act; and Division C is the Supreme Court Security Funding Act of 2022.

History 
The CHIPS and Science Act combines two bipartisan bills: the Endless Frontier Act, designed to boost investment in domestic high-tech research and the CHIPS for America Act, designed to bring semiconductor manufacturing back to the U.S. The act is aimed at competing with China.

The Endless Frontier Act was initially presented to Senators Chuck Schumer (D-NY) and Todd Young (R-IN) by Under Secretary of State Keith Krach in October 2019, as part of the Global Economic Security Strategy to boost investment in high-tech research vital to U.S. national security. The plan was to grow $150 billion in government R&D funding into a $500 billion investment, with matching investments from the private sector and a coalition of technological allies dubbed the "Techno-Democracies-10" (TD-10). On May 27, 2020, Senators Young and Schumer, along with Congressmen Ro Khanna (D-CA) and Mike Gallagher (R-WI.), introduced the bipartisan, bicameral Endless Frontier Act to solidify the United States’ leadership in scientific and technological innovation through increased investments in the discovery, creation, and commercialization of technology fields of the future.

The United States Innovation and Competition Act of 2021 (USICA) (S. 1260), formerly known as the Endless Frontier Act, was United States legislation sponsored by Senate Majority Leader Chuck Schumer and Senator Young authorizing $110 billion for basic and advanced technology research over a five-year period. Investment in basic and advanced research, commercialization, and education and training programs in artificial intelligence, semiconductors, quantum computing, advanced communications, biotechnology and advanced energy, amounts to $100 billion. Over $10 billion was authorized for appropriation to designate ten regional technology hubs and create a supply chain crisis-response program.

The CHIPS for America Act portion stemmed from Under Secretary of State Krach and his team brokering the $12 billion on-shoring of TSMC (Taiwan Semiconductor Manufacturing Company) to secure the supply chain of sophisticated semiconductors, on May 15, 2020. Krach's stated strategy was to use the TSMC announcement as a stimulus for fortifying a trusted supply chain by attracting TSMC's broad ecosystem of suppliers; persuading other chip companies to produce in U.S., especially Intel and Samsung; inspiring universities to develop engineering curricula focused on semiconductor manufacturing and designing a bipartisan bill (CHIPS for America) to provide the necessary funding. This led to Krach and his team's close collaboration in creating the CHIPS for America component with Senators John Cornyn (R-TX) and Mark Warner (D-VA). In June 2020, Senator Warner joined U.S. Senator John Cornyn in introducing the $52 billion CHIPS for America Act.

Both bills were eventually merged into the U.S. Innovation and Competition Act (USICA). On June 8, 2021, the USICA passed 68–32 in the Senate with bipartisan support. The House version of the Bill, America COMPETES Act of 2022 (H.R. 4521), passed on February 4, 2022. The Senate passed an amended bill by substituting the text of H.R. 4521 with the text of the USICA on March 28, 2022. A Senate and House conference was required to reconcile the differences, which resulted in the bipartisan CHIPS and Science Act, or "CHIPS Plus". The bill passed the U.S. Senate by a vote of 64–33 on July 27, 2022. On July 28, the $280 billion bill passed the U.S. House by a vote of 243–187–1. On August 1, 2022, the magazine EE Times (Electronic Engineering) dubbed Under Secretary of State Keith Krach (now the current Chairman of the Krach Institute for Tech Diplomacy at Purdue University) the architect of the CHIPS and Science Act. The bill was signed into law by President Joe Biden on August 9, 2022.

Background and provisions 
The bill constitutes an industrial policy initiative which takes place against the background of a perceived AI Cold War between the US and China, as artificial intelligence technology relies on semiconductors. The bill was considered amidst a global semiconductor shortage and intended to provide subsidies and tax credits to chip makers with operations in the United States. The U.S. Department of Commerce was granted the power to allocate funds based on companies' willingness to sustain research, build facilities, and train new workers.

For semiconductor and telecommunications purposes, the CHIPS Act designates roughly $106 billion. The CHIPS Act includes $39 billion in tax benefits and other incentives to encourage American companies to build new chip manufacturing plants in the U.S. Additionally, $11 billion would go toward advanced semiconductor research and development, with $8.5 billion of that amount going to the National Institute for Standards and Technology, $500 million to Manufacturing USA, and $2 billion to a new public research hub called the National Semiconductor Technology Center. $24 billion would go to a new 25 percent advanced semiconductor manufacturing tax credit to encourage firms to stay in the United States, and $200 million would go to the National Science Foundation to resolve short-term labor supply issues.

According to McKinsey, "The CHIPS Act allocates $2 billion to the Department of Defense to fund microelectronics research, fabrication, and workforce training. An additional $500 million goes to the Department of State to coordinate with foreign-government partners on semiconductor supply chain security. And $1.5 billion funds the USA Telecommunications Act of 2020, which aims to enhance competitiveness of software and hardware supply chains of open RAN 5G networks." Companies are subjected to a ten-year ban prohibiting them from producing chips more advanced than 28-nanometers in China and Russia if they are awarded subsidies under the act.

The act authorizes $174 billion for uses other than semiconductor and telecom technologies. It authorizes, but does not appropriate, extended NASA funding for the International Space Station to 2030, partially funds the Artemis program returning humans to the Moon, and directs NASA to establish a Moon to Mars Program Office for a human mission to Mars beyond the Artemis program. The bill also obligates NASA to perform research into further domesticating its supply chains and diversifying and developing its workforce, reducing the environmental effects of aviation, integrating unmanned aerial vehicle detection with air traffic control, investigating nuclear propulsion for spacecraft, continuing the search for extraterrestrial intelligence and xenology efforts, and boosting astronomical surveys for Near-Earth objects including the NEO Surveyor project.

The bill could potentially invest $67 billion in accelerating advanced zero-emissions technologies to mass markets and improving climate science research, according to the climate action think tank Rocky Mountain Institute. The bill would invest $81 billion in the NSF, including new money for STEM education and defense against foreign intellectual property infringement, and $20 billion in the new Directorate for Technology, Innovation, and Partnerships, which would be tasked with deploying the above technologies, and authorizes but does not appropriate $12 billion for ARPA-E. It contains annual budget increases for the United States Department of Energy for other purposes including supercomputer, nuclear fusion and particle accelerator research, and directs the United States Department of Commerce to establish $10 billion worth of research hubs in post-industrial, mostly rural economies.

Passage 

Every senator in the Senate Democratic Caucus except for Bernie Sanders voted in favor of passing the CHIPS Act, and they were joined by seventeen Republican senators, including Senate Republican leader Mitch McConnell, Utah senator Mitt Romney, and South Carolina senator Lindsey Graham.

Impact 
Since the May 2020 onshoring of TSMC used by Under Secretary of State Keith J. Krach as a catalyst for the bill and to secure the U.S. semiconductor supply chain, a significant number of companies and a list of ecosystem suppliers have committed or made announcements for investments and jobs in the US.

Before the act passed, the following investments were announced:

 In July 2021, GlobalFoundries announced plans to build a new $1 billion fab in Upstate New York.
 In November 2021, Samsung announced plans to build a $17 billion semiconductor factory to begin operations in the second half of 2024. It is the largest foreign direct investment ever in the state of Texas.
 In January 2022, Intel announced an initial $20 billion investment that will generate 3,000 jobs, making it the largest investment in Ohio's history, with plans to grow to $100 billion investment in eight total fabrication plants.
 In May 2022, Purdue University launched the nation's first comprehensive semiconductor degrees program in anticipation of the overwhelming need for 50,000 trained semiconductor engineers in the United States to meet the rapidly growing demand in anticipation of the CHIPS Act.
 In May 2022, Texas Instruments broke ground on new 300-mm semiconductor wafer fabrication plants in Sherman, Texas, and projected its investments will reach $30 billion and create as many as 3,000 jobs.
 In July 2022, SkyWater announced plans to build an advanced $1.8 billion semiconductor manufacturing facility in partnership with the state government of Indiana and Purdue University to pursue CHIPS funding.

After the CHIPS and Science Act passed, the following investments were announced:

 In October 2022, Micron Technology announced it will invest $20 billion in a new chip factory in Clay, New York, to take advantages of the subsidies in the act and signaled it could expand its investments to $100 billion over 20 years.  The state of New York granted the company $5.5 billion in tax credits as an incentive to locate there, if it meets employment promises.
 In December 2022, TSMC announced the opening of the company's second chip plant in Arizona, raising its investments in the state from $12 billion to $40 billion. At that time, they also stated that they were running into major cost issues, because the cost of construction of buildings and facilities in the US is four to five times what an identical plant would cost in Taiwan, (due to higher costs of labor, red tape, and training), as well as difficulty finding qualified personel (for which it has hired US workers and sent them for training in Taiwan for 12-18 months.) These additional production costs will increase the cost of TSMC's chips made in the US to at least 50% more than the cost of chips made in Taiwan.
 In February 2023, Integra Technologies announced a $1.8 billion investment in a new fab in Wichita, Kansas.
 In February 2023, Texas Instruments announced an $11 billion investment in a new 300-mm wafer fab in Lehi, Utah.
 In February 2023, EMP Shield announced a $1.9 billion investment in a new campus in Burlington, Kansas.

California
In California, home to the birthplace of the semiconductor industry, Silicon valley, experts say that it is very unlikely that any new manufacturing facilities will be built, due to tight regulations, high costs of land and electricity, and unreliable water supplies. These factors have contributed to the state's 33% decline in manufacturing jobs since 1990.

Reception

Support 
Many legislators and elected officials from across both the federal government and various state governments endorsed the passage. A large group of governors consisting of Pennsylvania's Tom Wolf, Alabama's Kay Ivey, California's Gavin Newsom, Kentucky's Andy Beshear, Michigan's Gretchen Whitmer, Wisconsin's Tony Evers, Illinois' J. B. Pritzker, Kansas' Laura Kelly, and North Carolina's Roy Cooper pushed for the passage of the bill back in November 2021.

Separately, Ohio governor Mike DeWine, whose state became the home of Intel's newest semiconductor fabrication plant in the Columbus suburb of New Albany, as well as Texas governor Greg Abbott and Texas senator John Cornyn, whose state was the home of a major investment from Samsung, each pushed for the bill to be passed and applauded at its advancement through Congress. It has received widespread support from chip firms, though they were concerned about the provision banning them from further investments in China.

Pat Gelsinger, CEO of Intel, indicated in an earnings call on September 30, 2022 that, thanks in part to CHIPS Act subsidies, the company was exploring building empty fab buildings (known as a "shell-first strategy") and aggressively acquiring smaller competitors before installing any equipment, in order to avoid contributing to a predicted semiconductor glut.

Opposition 
The bill was criticized by Republican House leader Kevin McCarthy and senator Bernie Sanders as a "blank check", which the latter equated to a bribe to semiconductor companies. China lobbied against the bill and criticized it as being "reminiscent of a 'Cold War mentality.

Concerns of protectionism 
Commentators have expressed concerns regarding the protectionist provisions of the CHIPS and Science Act and the risk of a subsidy race with the EU, which passed its own European Chips Act in 2022.

Concerns of inaction on labor and stock buybacks
Robert Kuttner, economic nationalist commentator and editor of The American Prospect, expressed concerns that the bill did not provide enough resources to allow local residents near fabs to organize or form a trade union (thereby making unions rely too heavily on community benefits agreements compared to federal policy), that the Commerce Department would be too friendly to states with right-to-work laws (where the first new fabs would be built), that the bill did not restrictively define a "domestic company" regarding financing, and that fab owners would simply use CHIPS Act money to buy back stocks. In response to these concerns, on February 28, 2023, United States Secretary of Commerce Gina Raimondo published the first application for CHIPS Act grants, which encourages fab operators to use Project Labor Agreements for facilitating union negotiations during construction, outline their plans to curtail stock buybacks, share excess profits with the federal government, and open child care facilities.

See also
 America COMPETES Act of 2022 – original House version
 European Chips Act
 Infrastructure Investment and Jobs Act and Inflation Reduction Act of 2022 – other major acts in industrial policy signed by Biden
 Technology policy
 United States Innovation and Competition Act – original Senate version
 Artificial Intelligence Cold War
 National Artificial Intelligence Initiative Act of 2020

References

External links
 CHIPS and Science Act as amended (PDF/details) in the GPO Statute Compilations collection
 CHIPS and Science Act as enacted (PDF/details) in the US Statutes at Large
 H.R.4346 - Chips and Science Act bill information on Congress.gov

Acts of the 117th United States Congress
China–United States relations
Presidency of Joe Biden
United States federal budgets
United States federal energy legislation